Elections to Liverpool Town Council were held on Friday 1 November 1861. One third of the council seats were up for election, the term of office of each councillor being three years, and nine of the 16 wards were uncontested. After the election, the composition of the council was:

Election result

Because of the large number of uncontested seats, these statistics should be taken in that context.

Ward results

* - Retiring Councillor seeking re-election

Abercromby

Castle Street

Everton

Exchange

Until the Ballot Act 1872 polling at elections was in public and the state of the polls were reported on an hour by hour basis in the newspapers.

Great George

Lime Street

North Toxteth

The discrepancy between the final results given in the Council Minute Book and the 4 o'clock final figures as reported in the Liverpool Mercury should perhaps be attributed to errors 
in the newspaper report.

Pitt Street

Rodney Street

St. Anne Street

St. Paul's

St. Peter's

Scotland

South Toxteth

Vauxhall

West Derby

By-elections

See also
 Liverpool Town Council elections 1835 - 1879
 Liverpool City Council elections 1880–present
 Mayors and Lord Mayors of Liverpool 1207 to present
 History of local government in England

References

1861
1861 English local elections
November 1861 events
1860s in Liverpool